The 2018–19 PSA Women's World Squash Championship was the 2018–19 women's edition of the World Squash Championships, which serves as the individual world championship for squash players. The event took place in Chicago, United States from 23 February - 2 March 2019. It was the first World Championships to be staged under a new tour structure and has a record prize money level of $1million.

Nour El Sherbini won her third world title beating Nour El Tayeb in the final continuing the recent Egyptian domination of the sport.

Seeds

Finals

Draw

Top half

Bottom half

See also
 World Squash Championships
 2018–19 PSA Men's World Squash Championship

References

World Squash Championships
W
W
Squash tournaments in the United States
International sports competitions hosted by the United States
Squ
Squ
Squ
Squ
PSA Women's World Squash Championship
PSA Women's World Squash Championship
Sports in Chicago
2010s in Chicago
Women's sports in Illinois